Bruno Bjelinski (born Bruno Weiss; 1 November 1909 – 3 September 1992) was one of the most influential Croatian composers in the 20th century. He was extremely prolific as a composer. His unique musical style was built upon the music of Poulenc, Hindemith, Ravel and Milhaud. He developed his own and recognizable musical language with the elements of neoclassicism. Bjelinski composed six operas, three ballets, 15 symphonies, 2 cello concertos, a cantata, piano music, songs, chamber music, and concertos for piano, violin, viola, bassoon, flute, and piano duo. He also composed music for the Croatian football movie Plavi 9.

Biography

Bjelinski was born in Trieste into a Jewish family. His mother died very early in his life so his father brought him to Zagreb where he was nurtured by his grandmother. In his youth he played violin and piano. Later he changed his surname from Weiss to Bjelinski (derivation of the word bijeli, meaning 'white' in Croatian). He doctored in law at the University of Zagreb and later studied music at the Zagreb Academy of Music under Blagoje Bersa and Franjo Dugan. Bjelinski started composing in the 1930s. By the beginning of World War II he had finished his 2 sonatas for violin and piano, 3 piano suites and a toccata. During World War II he was sent to a concentration camp, but in 1943, with the help of a friend, he escaped and joined the Partisans on the island of Korčula. At the end of the war he lived alternately on island Vis and in the Italian city of Bari. He taught at the Academy from 1945 to 1977. In the late 1950s he married young and perspective pianist Ljerka Pleslić (b. 1938) with whom he had two sons, Dean and Alan Bjelinski. The younger son Alan later became composer and conductor. Bjelinski died on 3 September 1992 on the island Silba where he was buried.

Bjelinski's music is described as being direct and optimistic, his fresh style lending itself to both serious music and music for children. Bjelinski composed six operas, three ballets, 15 symphonies, 2 cello concertos, a cantata, piano music, songs, chamber music, and concertos for piano, violin, viola, bassoon, flute, and piano duo. He also composed music for the Croatian football movie Plavi 9.

Legacy

He is the author of a very copious oeuvre and of a characteristic melodic, harmonic and rhythmic invention. Bjelinski never belonged expressly to the “national course” but he was far from indifferent to folk music (the influence of idiosyncratic Balkan rhythms and even of exotic South American dances mirroring the impressions of the composer's repeated stays in Brazil, with occasional inspirations by the particular features of jazz). The fundamental features of this sensitive and easily recognisable musical speech are a light Mediterranean lyricism, a general facility of expression and a message that is always optimistic, all interwoven with occasional dramatically accumulated sounds. Visible in his work are traces of Baroque music with its incessant kinetic motion and well-thought-out structures. But neo-Classical impulses are always at the roots of his creative work; rejecting all that is outside the tried and tested laws of classical order, the composer, respecting these same laws, also played with them a little. The unpretentious poeticism of his works is often suffused with a gentle humour that occasionally borders on irony. Bjelinski successfully tried his hand at almost all the areas of serious music.

Awards

For his music he received several awards: Mlado pokoljenje award (1965), Vladimir Nazor Award (1976) for life achievement and Josip Slavenski award (1986). In the year of 1988 he became a member of Croatian Academy of Sciences and Arts.

Works (selection)

Concerto for flute and strings, 1955
Ljetna simfonija (Summer Symphony),  Symphony No. 1, 1955
Serenade for trumpet, piano, strings and percussion, 1957
Pčelica Maja (Maya the Bee),  fairy tale opera after Waldemar Bonsels, 1963
Sinfonia jubilans,  Symphony No. 4, 1965
Peter Pan, ballet for children, 1966
Sinfonietta concertante, for piano and orchestra, 1967
Musica Tonalis for oboe, bassoon and strings, 1968
Heraklo (Herkules) comic opera, 1971
Močvara (The Marsh), opera, 1972
Zvona (The Bells), opera, 1975
Orfej XX. stoljeca (Orpheus in the Twentieth Century), opera, 1981
Slavuj (The Nightingale), opera after Hans Christian Andersen, 1984
Concertino for horn and strings, 19??
Drei biblische Legenden for trombone and piano, 19??

References

Bibliography

 
 
 
 

1909 births
1992 deaths
Musicians from Trieste
Croatian Jews
Austro-Hungarian Jews
Croatian Austro-Hungarians
Croatian people of Italian-Jewish descent
Croatian composers
Jewish composers
Vladimir Nazor Award winners
Yugoslav Partisans members
Members of the Croatian Academy of Sciences and Arts
20th-century composers
Jewish classical composers
Male classical composers
20th-century Italian male musicians
Jews in the Yugoslav Partisans